Peder Otto Onstad (June 4, 1874 – March 17, 1961) was an American educator and politician.

Biography
Born in the town of Christiana, Dane County, Wisconsin, Onstad went to Albion Academy and to Luther College in Decorah, Iowa. He taught mathematics in rural schools and at Albion Academy. He was a farmer. Onstad served as Christiana town clerk and as chairman of the Christiana Town Board. In 1909 and 1911, Onstad served in the Wisconsin State Assembly as a Republican. In 1932, Onstad moved to Madison, Wisconsin and worked for the Wisconsin Highway Commission and for the Dane County Register of Deeds. Onstad died in Stoughton, Wisconsin.

References

External links

1874 births
1961 deaths
People from Christiana, Dane County, Wisconsin
Luther College (Iowa) alumni
Farmers from Wisconsin
Educators from Wisconsin
Mayors of places in Wisconsin
Republican Party members of the Wisconsin State Assembly